Molema Island is an island off the Kimberley coast of Western Australia.

Situated at the edge of Talbot Bay Molema is connected to the mainland by Turtle Reef, one of the largest reef systems in the Kimberley. Many mud flats also surround the island. The ria landscape is typical of the bioregion, the geology is intensely faulted and folded and was later inundated by the Holocene post glacial transgression.

The traditional owners of the area are the Worrorran peoples.

A population of the endangered northern quoll were found to be living on the island during surveys conducted in 2013.

See also 

 Australia
 Western Australia

References

Islands of the Kimberley (Western Australia)